David Miller may refer to:

Academics and scientists
 David Miller (engineer), aerospace engineer at MIT and NASA
 David Miller (entomologist) (1890–1973), New Zealand entomologist, university lecturer and scientific administrator
 David C. Miller (1917–1997), epidemiologist who cared for Albert Schweitzer
 David Miller (philosopher) (born 1942), British philosopher
 David Miller (political theorist) (born 1946), professor at Oxford
 David Miller (physician), pioneer in the home birth movement in Australia
 David Miller (sociologist) (born 1964), British sociologist
 David A. B. Miller (born 1954), professor at Stanford University
 David Philip Miller (born 1953), social historian of science
 David S. Miller (born 1974), computer programmer
 David W. Miller, scholar of the "faith at work" movement

Arts and entertainment 
 David Miller (architect) (born 1944), Seattle architect
 David Miller (director) (1909–1992), American film director
 David Miller (American musician) (1883–1953), American country musician
 David Miller (Australian musician) (born 1952), Australian pianist
 David Miller (painter) (born c.1950), Australian artist
 David Miller (tenor) (born 1973), operatic tenor and member of the band Il Divo
 David Alan Miller (born 1961), conductor
 David Humphreys Miller (1918–1992), American artist, writer and film advisor specialising in the Plains Indians
 David Lee Miller (director) (born 1955), American film director, screenwriter and producer
 David L. Miller (1925–1985), American record producer
 David Prince Miller (1809–1873), British showman and magician
 David Wiley Miller (born 1951), American cartoonist

Literature 
 David Miller (editor), British writer and journalist
 David Miller (poet) (born 1950), writer, poet, literary critic, and editor
 David Lee Miller (academic) (born 1951), American writer and professor

Military
 David N. Miller, United States Space Force general
 David V. Miller (1919–2016), U.S. Air Force general

Politics, government & diplomacy 
 David Miller (Canadian politician) (born 1958), former mayor of Toronto and later president of WWF-Canada
 David Wynn Miller (1949–2019), American pseudolegal theorist active in the sovereign citizen movement
 David Miller (Iowa politician) (born 1946), American politician
 David Miller (public servant) (1857–1934), senior Australian public servant
 David Miller (Wyoming politician) (born 1953), American politician
 David A. Miller (born 1948), mayor of Lubbock, Texas
 David E. Miller (born 1962), member of the Illinois House of Representatives
 David Charles Miller Jr. (born 1942), American ambassador
 David Hunter Miller (1875–1961), American lawyer and an expert on treaties, officer at the US state department
 David Miller (Kansas politician) (born 1949), former Chairman of the Kansas Republican Party

Sports 
 David Miller (baseball) (born 1973), American college baseball coach
 David Miller (Australian cricketer) (1870–1943), Australian cricketer
 David Miller (English cricketer) (born 1974), former English cricketer
 David Miller (South African cricketer) (born 1989), South African cricketer
 David Miller (American football) (born 1984), defensive end
 David Miller (Australian footballer) (born 1957), VFL footballer for Richmond
 David Miller (darts player), American professional darts player
 David Miller (harness racing) (born 1964), American harness racing driver and trainer
 David Miller (ice hockey) (1924–1996), Canadian ice hockey player
 David Miller (judoka) (born 1961), Canadian judoka
 David Miller (sailor) (born 1943), Canadian sailor

Others 
 David Miller (gangster), also known as Davy "Yiddles" Miller, a member of the Chicago gang Ragen's Colts
 David Miller (moderator), Scottish minister

See also 
 Dave Miller (disambiguation)
 David Millar (disambiguation)
 David E Miller Hill, a summit in Utah